Product Support Services, more commonly referred to as PSS, is the Microsoft business unit with primary responsibility for responding to end-user and partner requests for assistance with the company's products and services.

Feedback and product development
PSS also gives feedback to Microsoft development groups for use in the development of future products or product features. The Windows 2000 recovery console, for instance, was developed in large part to address difficulty that PSS agents had when attempting to assist customers with non-functional Windows NT installations. Additionally, PSS identifies major issues with products, and works with the responsible product teams in order to create "hotfixes" for these issues, and/or make sure that the issues are addressed in service packs or future product versions. It is a type of Call Center.

Support options
PSS offers a wide variety of support options, with varying prices. Options include assistance with:
Basic usage
"Break-fix" support
Security patch installation
Onsite and offsite consulting

Offices
PSS has major offices worldwide, including:
Las Colinas, Texas, United States
Issaquah, Washington, United States
Charlotte, North Carolina, United States
Embassy Golf Links, Bangalore, India

See also
Technical support

External links
Microsoft Corporation Home
Microsoft Product Support Services Home

Microsoft divisions

References